Tanzeem ul Makatib is an organisation devoted to religious awareness among the Shiites in India for education based in Lucknow, Uttar Pradesh. The organisation currently runs 1246 educational units (Maktab/Schools) in 38 of the provinces of India. Over 1947 teachers including 295 pesh namaz are imparting education to 50,457 children with utmost devotion and zeal. Specially designed syllabus is designed for these schools. The organisation also runs higher religious education centres, viz. Jamiya Imamia (for boys), Jameatuz Zahra (for girls) and a chain of Khadeejatul Kubra Madrasas (for college going girls desirous of religious education). These centres follow Hauza Syllabus. Religious educational conferences are organised by it on district, regional and provincial level. These conferences serve as short-term training camps. These conferences are not held at any fixed or permanent place but their venues are changed from time to time, so that more and more population of Shia community people can take benefit.

Sayed Safi Haidar is the current secretary of Tanzeemul Makatib.

Tanzeemul Makatib publishes various Islamic magazines too.

Maulana Syed Tehzeeb ul Hasan is the senior Islamic Scholar of Tanzeemul Makatib

See also
 Tafazzul Husain Kashmiri
 Madrasatul Waizeen
 Jamia Nazmia
 Sultanul Madaris
 Tanzeem-ul-Makatib
 Jamia Imania, Varanasi

References

Education in Lucknow
Madrasas in India